The Ga-Selati River or Selati River is a river in Limpopo, South Africa.

Course
It rises on the rugged western slopes of the Wolkberg Mountains, part of the Drakensberg Mountain chain, about 20 km SE of Tzaneen. From its source in this high rainfall zone, the river flows roughly eastward for approximately 140 kilometres before joining the Olifants River some 7 kilometres to the south of the town of Phalaborwa.

The Ga-Selati River's largest tributaries are the Ngwabitsi River and the Mulati River, both joining its right bank.

In the dry season, the riverbed of the Ga-Selati is dry for most of its length. This river is heavily polluted owing to mining activity at Phalaborwa in its lower course.

Dams in the basin
Tours Dam, in the Ngwabitsi River

See also 
 List of rivers of South Africa
 List of reservoirs and dams in South Africa

References

External links
Bioassessing the Impact of Water Quality

Olifants River (Limpopo)
Rivers of Limpopo